Alessio Zaccone (born 7 September 1981, Alessandria) is an Italian physicist.

Career and research
After a PhD at ETH Zurich, he held faculty positions at Technical University Munich, University of Cambridge and at the Physics Department of the University of Milan. In 2015 he was elected a Fellow of Queens' College, Cambridge.

Zaccone contributed to various areas of condensed matter physics.

He is known for his work on the atomic theory of elasticity and viscoelasticity of amorphous solids, in particular for having developed the microscopic theory of elasticity of random sphere packings and elastic random networks. With Konrad Samwer he developed the Krausser-Samwer-Zaccone equation for the viscosity of liquids.
With Eugene Terentjev he developed a molecular-level theory of the glass transition based on thermoelasticity, which provides the molecular-level derivation of the Flory-Fox equation for the glass transition temperature of polymers.

He is also known for having developed, in his PhD thesis, the extension of DLVO theory that describes the stability of colloidal systems in fluid dynamic conditions based on a new solution (developed using the method of matched asymptotic expansions) to the Smoluchowski convection-diffusion equation.  The predictions of the theory have been extensively verified experimentally by various research groups.
Also in his PhD thesis, he developed a formula for the shear modulus of colloidal nanomaterials,  which has been confirmed experimentally in great detail.
In 2020 he discovered and mathematically predicted that the low-frequency shear modulus of confined liquids scales with inverse cubic power of the confinement size.

In 2017 he was listed as one of the 37 most influential researchers worldwide (with less than 10–12 years of independent career) by the journal Industrial & Engineering Chemistry Research published by the American Chemical Society. In 2020 he was listed among the Emerging Leaders by the Journal of Physics published by the Institute of Physics.

As of August 2020, he has published well over 100 articles in peer-reviewed journals, h-index=30.

In January 2022 he proposed an approximate solution for the random close packing problem in 2D and 3D, which received multiple comments online.

Awards and honors
2010 - Alexander von Humboldt Fellowship
2011 - Oppenheimer Fellowship  
2011 - ETH Medal Award
2014 - Swiss National Science Foundation Professorship
2015 - Fellowship of Queens' College, Cambridge
2015 - Mößbauer-Professur of the Technical University of Munich
2017 - Industrial & Engineering Chemistry Research Class of 2017 Influential Researcher
2020 - Gauß-Professur of the Göttingen Academy of Sciences and Humanities
2020 - Journal of Physics: Materials Emerging Leader

Selected publications
.
.
.
.

References

External links
 

Fellows of Queens' College, Cambridge
Living people
21st-century Italian physicists
Academics of the University of Cambridge
Academic staff of the Technical University of Munich
1981 births
ETH Zurich alumni
Academic staff of the University of Milan